Volvo Trucks have built a number of engines, beginning in the late 1920s. In the 2010s, they have also begun using engines developed by Germany's Deutz AG. They were one of the first companies to use turbodiesel engines in commercially successful trucks.

B36

The Volvo B36 is a four-stroke, cast-iron 90 degree petrol V8 introduced in 1952. The engine weighs  and displaces 3.56 liters. The two-port Carter carburetor and intake are located between the cylinder banks. The crossflow heads are of a cast iron alloy, while the five-bearing camshaft is of a case-hardened steel alloy. The engine is often said to be a twinned B18 four-cylinder, but in reality only some parts in the valve train are interchangeable between the two engines.

This engine was used in the Volvo L420 Snabbe truck, amongst others. It had been developed by Volvo for a planned luxury automobile called Volvo Philip in the early 1950s, when this project was cancelled it was installed in a truck instead. Due to excessive thirst, diesel engines soon became available in this range of trucks. The B36 was discontinued in 1973, although it had no longer been used in trucks after 1966. It was the last petrol truck engine built by Volvo, and the only V8 engine in any vehicle except for the newer Yamaha built unit used in XC90 and S80.

A marine version was available, the Volvo Penta AQ180 boasting 180 hp with twin carburetors.

D36
Volvo originally lacked the resources to develop their own diesel engines. To fill the gap, the 3610 cc 4D "Dorset" OHV diesel inline-four engine built by Ford for their Fordson Major tractor was used, beginning in 1963. It was installed in the Volvo 425 (Snabbe) and the 435 (Trygge) until 1966, when a more powerful Perkins unit replaced it. The so-called D36 only has .

D39
A 3869 cc OHV diesel inline-four engine from Perkins Engines was used by Volvo from late 1966 (Perkins 4.236), installed in the F82 and F83 (renamed models of the "Snabbe" and "Trygge"). It was eventually replaced by Volvo's own range of diesel engines. Labelled the D39 by Volvo, it has .

D6B

D7E

D12 
"When the D12 engine was launched in 1993, it was truly a revolution. Some said Volvo was ten years ahead in time. Göran Nyholm, now a retired Volvo engineer, tells us the story from the beginning".

D13 
"The Volvo D13 features 14 different power ratings ranging from 375 up to 515 horsepower (export configuration). A new variable geometry turbocharger provides quick response to throttle inputs while improving fuel economy. Volvo offers two XE, integrated drivetrain ratings, as well as six Eco-Torque and three Dual-Torque ratings to allow customers to match engine performance to specific application requirements".

D16 
(Text here)

References

Engines
Lists of automobile engines
Car-related lists
Truck-related lists